Borknagar is a Norwegian heavy metal band from Bergen, founded in 1995 by Øystein Garnes Brun. The band's style combines black metal and folk metal with progressive and melodic elements. Borknagar's lyrics often deal with philosophy, paganism, nature and the cosmos.

History
Borknagar was founded by Øystein Brun, then a member of the Norwegian death metal band Molested, when he became tired of the brutal aspects of the band's music. Øystein formed Borknagar to explore a more melodic outlet of expression, inspired by the burgeoning black metal movement Norway was experiencing and looking to push the boundaries of what was considered "traditional" black metal music. He wrote all of the music and lyrics and gathered together an all-star group of black metal musicians to play in his band, such as Infernus of Gorgoroth, Grim of Immortal and Gorgoroth and Ivar Bjørnson of Enslaved. When Garm of Ulver, Head Control System and Arcturus joined the project, it brought the band immediate attention. The band never even recorded a demo; they simply asked for a record contract on Malicious Records and were granted their request based on the strength of this lineup. Borknagar's music instantly gained fans and received positive press attention. In 1999, Grim committed suicide using sleeping pills. He was replaced by Justin Greaves who left shortly after to be replaced by Asgeir Mickelson.

Borknagar has released eleven albums to date. Their self-titled debut album features lyrics solely in Norwegian; all subsequent albums have featured lyrics written in English exclusively (however, The Olden Domain featured an instrumental track titled in Norwegian). Aside from Brun's lyrical contributions, the band has featured lyrics by other members as well: ICS Vortex from Arcturus and ex-Dimmu Borgir, drummer Asgeir Mickelson, keyboardist Lars Nedland and more recently by current vocalist Vintersorg from Otyg and his eponymous band. Bassist Jan Erik Tiwaz (a.k.a. Tyr) wrote the song 'The View of Everlast'. All of the band's records (excluding the original pressing of the debut album) have been released by the label Century Media. Borknagar has toured with various bands including Emperor, Peccatum, In Flames, Morbid Angel and Cradle of Filth.

Borknagar released a lighter album, Origin, which is "an acoustic effort based entirely on the epic and progressive aspect of the band", according to Øystein G. Brun's statement on Blabbermouth.net.

In late December 2007, the band signed a three-album deal with the Norwegian label Indie Recordings. In March 2008, Asgeir posted an announcement from Øystein on UltimateMetal forums stating that Erik Tiwaz and Jens F. Ryland had again become official members of the band, and that the band were aiming for a January 2009 release. In May 2008, Øystein released another statement announcing Asgeir's departure as the band's drummer, due to "evolving differences in musical ideas and visions [...] The split happens in friendly manner and with mutual respect for the decision that he has made. He will remain a good friend of the band." A new drummer, the American David Kinkade, who has worked with Arsis and Malevolent Creation has joined the band since.

In April 2009, the band announced that their upcoming album is titled Universal. The album, scheduled for a September release was postponed to a February 2010 release.

In early June 2010, Jan Erik Tiwaz left the bass guitarist position of Borknagar due to "general disagreements", and ICS Vortex replaced him and Vintersorg on the upcoming tour.

Also in June 2010, the band announced their first tour of South America, with ICS Vortex on vocals.

On 25 August 2010, the band announced that they were forced to cancel the South American tour due to reasons beyond their control. 

In January 2011, the deal with Indie Recordings were terminated and on 28 March 2011 Borknagar signed a new worldwide 3 album deal with Century Media Records.

On 22 April 2011, the band officially announced the return of ICS Vortex on both bass and vocals.

Drummer Dave Kinkade announced on his official Facebook page on 25 October 2011 that he had "mutually parted ways with Borknagar" and that he'll "be focusing 100% on Soulfly now".

On 22 February 2012, it was announced on the Norwegian website Artisan that the new drummer for the band would be Baard Kolstad.

Throughout 2014 and into 2015, the band had been hard at work writing and recording their next full-length album, Winter Thrice. Production had to be delayed due to injuries vocalist Vintersorg suffered in late 2014 but the recording was concluded in June. Original vocalist Kristoffer Rygg provided guest vocals on the aforementioned record.

In early 2019, it was reported that long-time vocalist Vintersorg has parted ways with the band due to conflicting issues with his work and family, as well as the after effects of his 2014 injuries. The split was amicable and he has not ruled out being a guest on a future album. As well, drummer Baard Kolstad also parted ways due to lack of time due to his other in-demand projects. ICS Vortex has since reassumed the role of lead vocalist and Kolstad was replaced by Bjørn Dugstad Rønnow (at Kolstad's recommendation). Despite these setbacks, Borknagar released their eleventh album, True North, on 27 September 2019.

Musical style
Their musical style has been described as progressive metal, black metal, folk metal, Viking metal and avant-garde metal.

Members

Current members
 Øystein G. Brun – guitar 
 ICS Vortex (Simen Hestnæs) – lead and backing vocals , bass 
 Lazare (Lars A. Nedland) – keyboard, backing and lead vocals 
 Bjørn Dugstad Rønnow – drums 
 Jostein Thomassen – guitar

Former members
 Infernus (Roger Tiegs) – bass 
 Garm (Kristoffer Rygg) – lead and backing vocals 
 Ivar Bjørnson – keyboard 
 Grim (Erik Brødreskift) – drums 
 Kai K. Lie – bass 
 Jens F. Ryland – guitar 
 Justin Greaves – drums 
 Asgeir Mickelson – drums , bass and additional guitars 
 Tyr (Jan Erik Tiwaz) – bass 
 Vintersorg (Andreas Hedlund) – lead and backing vocals, additional guitar and keyboards 
 David Kinkade – drums 
 Baard Kolstad – drums 
Touring members
 Athera (Pål Mathiesen) - lead and backing vocals

Timeline

Discography

Studio albums
Borknagar (1996, Malicious, Century Black)
The Olden Domain (1997, Century Black)
The Archaic Course (1998, Century Media)
Quintessence (2000, Century Media)
Empiricism (2001, Century Media)
Epic (2004, Century Media)
Origin (2006, Century Media)
Universal (2010, Indie Recordings)
Urd (2012, Century Media)
Winter Thrice (2016, Century Media)
True North (2019, Century Media)

Compilation albums
For the Elements (1996–2006) (2008, Century Media)

References

External links

Borknagar official forum (at UltimateMetal)

Borknagar (Inside Articles at ArtisanNorway)

Norwegian folk metal musical groups
Norwegian black metal musical groups
Norwegian viking metal musical groups
Viking metal musical groups
Norwegian progressive metal musical groups
Avant-garde metal musical groups
Heavy metal supergroups
Musical groups established in 1995
1995 establishments in Norway
Century Media Records artists
Musical groups from Bergen
Articles which contain graphical timelines